Bílek (feminine Bílková) is a Czech surname, it may refer to:
 Alexander Bílek, Czech athlete
 Dagmar Bílková, Czech sport shooter
 František Bílek, Czech sculptor
 Hynek Bílek, Czech ice dancer
 Jiří Bílek, Czech footballer
 Marek Bílek, Czech discus thrower
 Martin Bílek, Czech shot putter
 Michal Bílek, Czech football coach
 Roman Bílek, Czech race walker
 Vítězslav Bílek, Czech ice hockey player
Other name variant
 István Bilek Hungarian chess grandmaster
 Gyuláné Krizsán-Bilek, Hungarian chess master

Geography:
 Subdivision of the Czech town of Chotěboř

Czech-language surnames